Aaron Phillips  may refer to:
Aaron Phillips (fighter) (born 1989), American martial artist
Aaron Phillips (footballer)  (born 1993), English footballer

See also
Erin Phillips (born 1985), American basketball player
Aaron Phillip Hart (1724–1800), Canadian businessman